Dorothea of Brandenburg (9 February 1420 – 19 January 1491) was a princess of Brandenburg by birth and by marriage Duchess of Mecklenburg.

Life 
Dorothea was born in Berlin, a daughter of the Elector Frederick I of Brandenburg (1371–1440) from his marriage to Elisabeth (1383–1442), daughter of Duke Frederick of Bayern-Landshut.  Dorothea's brothers were Electors Frederick II and Albert Achilles, who successively ruled Brandenburg.

In May 1432, Dorothea married Duke Henry IV of Mecklenburg (1417–1477).  She received as dowry Dömitz and Gorlosen, which her sister Margaret had also received when she married into the House of Mecklenburg.  Margaret's husband, Albet V, however, had died shortly after the marriage.  When a dispute arose later between Brandenburg and Mecklenburg about the inheritance of the principality of Wenden, the family ties between Duke Henry and Elector Frederick made it easier to reach a settlement.

Henry IV died in 1477.  After 1485 Dorothea lived, she lived as a nun in the Rehna convent.  She died at the Benedictine monastery at Rehna in 1491 and was buried in the City Church of St. James' Church and St. Dionysius in Gadebusch.  Her grave stone is marked with an incised drawing of the Duchess as a nun, crowned by a canopy.

Issue 
From her marriage with Henry, Dorothy had the following children:
 Albert VI (1438–1483), Duke of Mecklenburg
 married in 1466 or 1468 Countess Catherine of Lindau-Ruppin († 1485)
 John VI († 1474), Duke of Mecklenburg
 Magnus II (1441–1503), Duke of Mecklenburg
 married in 1478 princess Sophie of Pomerania (1460-1504)
 Catherine (1442-1451/52)
 Anna (1447–1464)
 Elisabeth (1449–1506), abbess of Ribnitz
 Balthasar (1451–1507), Duke of Mecklenburg, coadjutor in the diocese of Schwerin until 1479

Notes

References 
 Carl Friedrich Goeschel: Elisabeth, die erste Kurfürstin von Brandenburg aus dem Hause Hohenzollern, Mittler, 1844, p. 35
 Samuel Buchholtz: Versuch einer Geschichte der Churmarck Brandenburg, F. W. Birnstiel, 1767, p. 39

Duchesses of Mecklenburg
House of Hohenzollern
House of Mecklenburg
1420 births
1491 deaths
Benedictine nuns
Daughters of monarchs